Audelais (also Adelais or Andelais) was an usurper of the duchy of Benevento for two years after the death of Romuald II. He overthrew Romuald's son and heir, Gisulf II. Liutprand, King of the Lombards, came down and removed both Gisulf and Audelais and placed his own candidate, Gregory, on the throne.

Sources
Notes of the Historia Langobardorum at Northvegr.

Dukes of Benevento
Lombard warriors
8th-century rulers in Europe
8th-century Lombard people